Eucalyptus pauciflora subsp. hedraia, commonly known as snow gum, is a mallee or small tree that is endemic to a small area of Victoria, Australia. It has smooth bark, branchlets that are often glaucous, glossy green lance-shaped to egg-shaped or elliptical adult leaves, flower buds in groups of between eleven and fifteen, white flowers and hemispherical or cup-shaped fruit. It differs from other subspecies of E. pauciflora in having larger, sessile, glaucous buds and broader, hemispherical fruit.

Description
It has smooth, white, grey, pale brown and green bark that usually has insect scribbles. Flowering has been recorded in December and January and the flowers are white. Subspecies hedraia differs from others in the species in having glaucous flower buds and broader, hemispherical fruit.

Taxonomy and naming
Eucalyptus pauciflora subsp. hedraia was first formally described in 1994 by Kevin James Rule in the journal Muelleria, from material collected in the Falls Creek Ski Village in 1982. The epithet (hedraia) is from ancient Greek, referring to the sessile buds and fruits.

Distribution
This subspecies is only known from the Falls Creek Ski Village area.

References

pauciflora
Flora of Victoria (Australia)
Plants described in 1994